Dowghanan (also Romanized as Dowghanān; also known as Dowghanān-e Pā’īn and Dūghtān) is a village in Derakhtengan Rural District, in the Central District of Kerman County, Kerman Province, Iran. At the 2006 census, its population was 69, in 21 families.

References 

Populated places in Kerman County